The Victoria's Secret Fashion Show is an annual fashion show sponsored by Victoria's Secret, a brand of lingerie and sleepwear. Victoria's Secret uses the show to promote and market its goods in high-profile settings. The show features some of the world's leading fashion models, including then current Victoria's Secret Angels Adriana Lima, Alessandra Ambrósio, Behati Prinsloo, Candice Swanepoel, Lily Aldridge, Lais Ribeiro, Elsa Hosk, Jasmine Tookes, Sara Sampaio, Martha Hunt, Jac Jagaciak, Taylor Hill, Stella Maxwell, Romee Strijd, and Kate Grigorieva.

The show featured musical performances by Ellie Goulding, Selena Gomez, and The Weeknd. Rihanna was scheduled to perform at the show but canceled her performance to focus on the recording of her 8th studio album, Anti.

Fashion show segments

Segment 1: Boho Psychedelic

Segment 2: Exotic Butterflies 
This segment was swapped in order of appearance with the third segment, Portrait of an Angel, for the TV version.

Segment 3: Portrait of an Angel 
This segment was swapped in order of appearance with the second segment, Exotic Butterflies, for the TV version.

Segment 4: PINK USA 

 Taylor Hill and  Megan Puleri returned to the runway at the end of the segment to close  Selena Gomez's performance.

Segment 5: Ice Angels

Segment 6: Fireworks

Finale 

 Behati Prinsloo and  Lily Aldridge led the finale.

Index

References

Victoria's Secret
2015 in fashion